Area codes 714 and 657 are telephone area codes covering northern Orange County, a portion of Los Angeles County, and the Sleepy Hollow and Carbon Canyon areas of Chino Hills in San Bernardino County in the U.S. state of California.

Cities in the 657 and 714 area codes include Tustin, Placentia, Anaheim, Buena Park, Costa Mesa (unique because it is split between the 714/657 and 949 area codes, at Wilson Street and along Newport Boulevard), Cypress, Fountain Valley, Fullerton, Orange, Garden Grove, Santa Ana, Villa Park, Yorba Linda, portions of La Habra, and most of Brea and Huntington Beach.

The original area code, 714, was split from area code 213 as a flash-cut in 1951. Originally, it included most of Southern California, generally south and east of Los Angeles, extending to the Arizona and Nevada state lines to the east, and south as far as the Mexican border (what is now area codes 442/760, 619, 858, 909, and 951). Despite Southern California's explosive growth in the second half of the 20th century, this configuration remained in place for 31 years.

Finally, on January 1, 1982, most of the southern and eastern portion, centered around San Diego and the desert areas, became area code 619. In 1992, eastern Los Angeles and the Inland Empire became area code 909. On April 18, 1998, the southern cities of Orange County were split from 714, creating area code 949.

By 2007, 714 was running out of numbers due to Southern California's continued growth and the proliferation of cell phones and pagers. As a solution, area code 657 was overlaid onto the 714 territory on September 23, 2008.

The two area codes now cover northern and western Orange County (except for portions of La Habra and all of Seal Beach, Los Alamitos, the far northwestern portion of Brea, and the western portions of La Palma, which have always been in the same area code as Long Beach—currently the 562 area code). This is probably because at the time those splits first occurred, while most cities in Southern California were provided primary local telephone service from what was then Pacific Bell (now AT&T), the cities listed above were served by GTE, the primary telephone provider for Long Beach (this territory has since become part of Verizon, and now Frontier Communications).

Today, five cities "straddle" the 657/714 and 949 area codes: Costa Mesa, Irvine, Santa Ana, Tustin, and Newport Beach.

Communities served by 657 and 714

Los Angeles County
Cerritos (mostly in the 562 area code)
La Mirada (mostly in the 562 area code)

Orange County

Anaheim
Brea (small portion in the 562 area code)
Buena Park 
Costa Mesa (small portion in the 949 area code)
Cypress (small portion in the 562 area code)
Fountain Valley
Fullerton (small portion in the 562 area code)
Garden Grove
Huntington Beach (small portion in the 562 area code)
Irvine (mostly in the 949 area code)
La Habra (mostly in the 562 area code)
La Palma (small portion in the 562 area code)
Los Alamitos (mostly in the 562 area code)
Midway City
Modjeska Canyon
Newport Beach (mostly in the 949 area code)
North Tustin
Orange Park Acres
Orange
Placentia
Santa Ana (small portion in the 949 area code)
Santiago Canyon
Seal Beach (mostly in the 562 area code)
Silverado
Stanton
Tustin Foothills
Tustin (small portion in the 949 area code)
Villa Park
Westminster
Yorba Linda

San Bernardino County
Chino Hills (mostly in the 909 area code)

See also
List of California area codes
List of NANP area codes
North American Numbering Plan

References

External links
 714 Area code history, California PUC

657 and 714
Orange County, California
Los Angeles County, California
San Bernardino County, California
Telecommunications-related introductions in 1951
Telecommunications-related introductions in 2008
657 and 714